Yann Guyot (born 26 February 1986 in Vannes) is a French cyclist, who most recently rode for French amateur team Véloce Vannetais.

Major results

2008
 1st Grand Prix de Plouay amateurs
2010
 1st Road race, Brittany Regional Road Championships
 1st Circuit du Morbihan
 1st La Roue Tourangelle
2011
 1st Grand Prix de Plouay amateurs
 1st Stage 3 Boucles de la Marne
2013
 1st Bordeaux–Saintes
 1st Trophée Loire-Atlantique
 2nd Paris–Chauny
 4th Grand Prix des Marbriers
2014
 1st  Road race, National Amateur Road Championships
 1st Overall Tour Nivernais Morvan
1st Stage 4
 1st Grand Prix de Corbère
 1st Ronde du Canigou
 1st La Melrandaise
 1st Tour du Pays du Roumois
 1st Boucles de l'Austreberthe
 1st Boucles Sérentaises
 1st Grand Prix Cristal Energie
 1st Grand Prix de la Saint-Laurent Elite-Prix des Stars
 1st Grand Prix des Marbriers
 1st Grand Prix de la ville de Fougères
 1st Paris–Connerré
 1st Stage 4 Tour de Moselle
 2nd Grand Prix de la ville de Buxerolles
 2nd Tour du Canton de Saint-Ciers
 2nd Grand Prix de Boussière-sur-Sambre
 3rd Overall Trois jours de Cherbourg
 4th Polynormande
 5th Overall Tour du Loir-et-Cher
 9th Overall Tour de Bretagne
1st Stage 1
2015
 1st Stage 3 Tour du Loir-et-Cher
 3rd Manche–Océan
 7th La Drôme Classic
 10th Boucles de l'Aulne
2017
 3rd Overall Paris–Arras Tour

References

External links

 
 

1986 births
Living people
French male cyclists
Sportspeople from Vannes
Cyclists from Brittany